The 55th Uddeholm Swedish Rally, the second round of the 2006 World Rally Championship season took place from February 3–5, 2006.

Results

Retirements

  Petter Solberg - excluded (SS18)
  Andreas Aigner - engine (SS16)
  Mattias Ekström - accident (SS14)

Special stages
All dates and times are CET (UTC+1).

Championship standings after the event

Drivers' championship

Manufacturers' championship

External links
 Results at eWRC.com
 Results from the official site: WRC.com
 Results on RallyBase.nl

Sweden
2006
Rally